Rudbarak-e Bala (also Romanized as Rūdbārak-e Bālā; also known as Rūdbār and Rūdbārak) is a village in Poshtkuh Rural District, Shahmirzad District, Mehdishahr County, Semnan Province, Iran. At the 2006 census, its population was 17, in 8 families.

Together with the nearby village of Rudbarak-e Pain, the village hosts the National Festival of Iranian Traditions and Folk Games.

References 

Populated places in Mehdishahr County